Gaetano Vitale (born 4 August 2001) is an Italian footballer who plays as midfielder for  club Gubbio on loan from Monopoli.

Club career

Early career 
Vitale played for Sorrento Youth Sector. In the 2018–19 season, he was awarded as "best young player of 2018–19 Serie D", making 27 appearances and scoring three goals for Sorrento. In the 2019–20 season, he made 26 appearances and scored two goals.

Foggia 
On 27 September 2020, Vitale was signed by Salernitana, and was then loaned to Foggia.

Seregno 
In the summer 2021, Vitale was loaned to Seregno.

Monopoli
On 20 July 2022, Vitale signed a three-year contract with Monopoli. On 1 September 2022, he was loaned by Gubbio.

Style of play 
Vitale has been compared to Nicolò Barella for his excellent vision and shooting.

References 

2001 births
Living people
People from Castellammare di Stabia
Footballers from Campania
Italian footballers
Association football midfielders
Serie C players
Serie D players
U.S. Salernitana 1919 players
Calcio Foggia 1920 players
U.S. 1913 Seregno Calcio players
S.S. Monopoli 1966 players
A.S. Gubbio 1910 players